Osmotherley Friends Meeting House is a Friends Meeting House of the Religious Society of Friends (Quakers), situated in the village of Osmotherley in North Yorkshire, England. It is a Grade II listed building.

It is still used regularly as a place of worship. Meeting for worship is held on the third Sunday of each month at 1500 hours GMT.

The Meeting House and a separate dormitory block are available for letting to organised groups and families, both Quaker and non-Quaker, and can sleep up to 25.

References

External links
Northern Echo article

Churches in North Yorkshire
Grade II listed religious buildings and structures
Grade II listed buildings in North Yorkshire
Quaker meeting houses in England
Religious buildings and structures completed in 1723
18th-century Quaker meeting houses
1723 establishments in England
Osmotherley, North Yorkshire